Gene Epstein (born 1944) is an American economist. He worked as the economics editor of Barron's Magazine from 1993 to 2017.  He calls himself a follower of the  Austrian School of economics and is an associated scholar at the Ludwig von Mises Institute in Auburn, Alabama.

Career
Epstein earned a BA from Brandeis University and an MA in economics from the New School. He taught economics at St. John’s University and the City University of New York. He wrote a book called Making Money in Commodities in 1976 and later worked as a senior economist for the New York Stock Exchange.

In 1993 he became economics editor and columnist of "Economic Beat" for Barron's Magazine. His book, Econospinning, was published in 2006. The book was met with some controversy in the blogosphere after Tyler Cowen mentioned it in his blog Marginal Revolution.

He now runs a monthly debate series called The Soho Forum, which “features topics of special interest to libertarians and aims to enhance social and professional ties within the NYC libertarian community.” In its most widely viewed debate, Gene himself debated Richard D. Wolff on the issues of socialism and capitalism. As of May 2022, the recording of the debate has been viewed over 5 million times.

Personal life
Gene Epstein currently resides in downtown Manhattan with his wife and prominent artist, Hisako Kobayashi.

References

External links
 
 
 Interview on NPR about the unemployment rate
 Review  of Econospinning
 The Soho Forum

1944 births
Living people
21st-century American economists
American libertarians
Austrian School economists
Libertarian economists
Mises Institute people
Brandeis University alumni